Hardenberg and von Hardenberg are German surnames, originally given to people from various places called Hardenberg.

Noble family
Some of these belong to the German noble family of the Princes, Counts and Barons von Hardenberg or their Danish branch (see the German Wikipedia article Hardenberg family) with their ancestral seat at Nörten-Hardenberg since 1287 to this day. Notable people with these surnames include:

 Albert Hardenberg (c. 1510–1574), Reformed theologian, born near Hardenberg, Overijssel 
 Anne Hardenberg (died 1588), Danish noblewoman
 Astrid Gräfin von Hardenberg (1925–2015), daughter of Carl-Hans Graf von Hardenberg
 Carl-Hans Graf von Hardenberg (1891–1958), German politician
 Georg Philipp Friedrich Freiherr von Hardenberg (1772–1801), German poet known as Novalis
 Henriette Hardenberg (1894–1993), German Expressionist poet
 Prince Karl August von Hardenberg (1750–1822), Prussian statesman
 Mette Hardenberg (1569–1629), Danish noble and landowner 
 Tita von Hardenberg (born 1968), stage name of German television journalist Katharina Isabel Gräfin von Hardenberg

See also
 Hardenberg (disambiguation)
 Hardenbergh
 Hardenburg (disambiguation)

References

German-language surnames
Toponymic surnames